Melanopsis letourneuxi is a species of freshwater gastropod endemic to streams in coastal Morocco and Algeria.

Distribution, ecology and threats 
Melanopsis letourneuxi is found almost exclusively in relatively shallow medium-sized streams with stony substrates, rarely occurring in stagnant sources. The species had historically been reported from several localities in north Africa, including a site in Algeria or (disputedly) Morocco - "in the source and the river Moulouya, west of Maghnia" from which it has not been documented recently- and two confirmed adjacent Moroccan sites -Berguent  and Ras el Ain at Aïn Beni Mathar - in which it is exceedingly rare. Remaining populations are threatened by water abstraction, pollution, and shell-collecting.

Populations 
Historically, several varieties (excluding the nominal var.) had been identified by Pallary and Bourguignat, including:

 † Melanopsis letourneuxi var. semesa
 Melanopsis letourneuxi var. magna (Berguent at Aïn Beni Mathar)*
 Melanopsis letourneuxi var. minor (Ras el Aïn at Aïn Beni Mathar)*
 Melanopsis letourneuxi var. emaciata (Berguent at Aïn Beni Mathar)
 Melanopsis letourneuxi var. mattarica (Ras el Aïn at Aïn Beni Mathar)

† Denotes that the variety is not mentioned by the nomenclator of Neubauer 2016

*Denotes that the variety is considered invalid by the nomenclator of Neubauer 2016

References

External links
 Bourguignat, J.-R. (1884). Histoire des Mélaniens du système européen. Annales de Malacologie. 2 (1): 1-168.

Melanopsidae
Gastropods described in 1880